Frederick of Brandenburg may refer to:

 Frederick I, Elector of Brandenburg (1371–1440) 
 Frederick II, Elector of Brandenburg (1413–1471), son of previous
 Frederick I, Margrave of Brandenburg-Ansbach (1460–1536)
 Frederick of Brandenburg (1530–1552), Prince-Archbishop of Magdeburg
 Frederick IX, Margrave of Brandenburg (1588–1611)
 Frederick III, Margrave of Brandenburg-Ansbach (1616–1634)
 Elector Frederick III of Brandenburg who became King Frederick I of Prussia (1657–1713)
 Frederick, Margrave of Brandenburg-Bayreuth (1711–1763)
 Elector Frederick IV of Brandenburg, also King Frederick II of Prussia (1712–1786)